NOW is a 2000 album by Cara Jones. It was the first international release for the million-selling singer-songwriter, whose career thus far had been mostly in Japan.  The album received favorable reviews in the US and abroad, and is continually used in soundtracks for film and television.

Track listing
All songs by Jones, except where otherwise noted.

"Spit It Out" – 3:58 – Cara Jones, Michael Aharon, Masanori Narikawa
"River High " – 3:42 – Cara Jones, Masanori Narikawa, Shigeru Watanabe, Norihiko Abe
"CandyBar" – 2:50 – Cara Jones and Michael Aharon
"Stay" – 3:54 – Cara Jones and Masanori Narikawa
"See It My Way " – 3:01 – Michael Aharon and John Anthony
"Choose" – 3:53
"Better Safe Than Sorry " – 3:44 – Steve Holloway and Cara Jones
"Heaven's Waiting " – 4:18
"1999" – 3:49
"Golden Thread" – 4:31 – Cara Jones and Nobuhiro Makino
"Settle For Love" – 5:56

The opening track, "Spit It Out", was featured in the opening scene of episode No. 501 of the popular television series, Dawsons Creek. The final track, "Settle For Love", charted on the original MP3.com at No. 1 on the Adult Alternative chart and has been featured in several films.

Musicians
Michael Aharon: guitars, keyboards and programming, piano, accordion,
bass, mandolin, bouzouki, dobro, cello, backing vocals
Steve Holloway: drums, congas 
Chico Huff: bass
John Anthony: percussion, drums 
Daryl Burgee: congas 
Bob Meashey: flugelhorn
Helen Bruner and Terry Jones: backing vocals 
Jenae Freed: backing vocals 
Irene Lambrou: backing vocals 
Cara Jones: vocals, additional piano

External links
 Artist Website: www.carajones.com
 Cara Jones on CD Baby

2000 albums
Cara Jones albums